Dan Holger Brzokoupil (born 8 May 1947) is a Swedish former footballer who played as a striker. He represented Djurgårdens IF, Landskrona BoIS, Hammarby IF, and Nyköpings BIS during a club career that spanned between 1967 and 1977. A full international between 1970 and 1971, he won five caps and scored three goals for the Sweden national team.

Club career
Brzokoupil, who has Czechoslovakian roots, played for Djurgårdens IF, Landskrona BoIS and Hammarby IF. He made 87 Allsvenskan matches for Djurgårdens IF and scored 28 goals.

International career 
Brzokoupil was capped five times for the Sweden national team and scored three goals. He also represented the Sweden U21 team between 1968 and 1969, scoring one goal in seven matches.

Career statistics

International 

 Scores and results list Sweden's goal tally first, score column indicates score after each Brzokoupil goal.

References

Swedish footballers
Allsvenskan players
Djurgårdens IF Fotboll players
Landskrona BoIS players
Hammarby Fotboll players
1947 births
Living people
Association football forwards
Sweden international footballers
Footballers from Stockholm